Otto of Brunswick may refer to:

 Otto IV, Holy Roman Emperor (1175–1218)
 Otto I, Duke of Brunswick-Lüneburg (1204 – 1252), also called Otto the Child
 Otto the Mild, Duke of Brunswick-Lüneburg (1292–1344)
 Otto II, Duke of Brunswick-Lüneburg (1266–1330), also called Otto the Strict 
 Otto III, Duke of Brunswick-Lüneburg (1296–1352)
 Otto IV, Duke of Brunswick-Lüneburg (d. 1446), also called Otto the Lame
 Otto V, Duke of Brunswick-Lüneburg (1439–1471), also called Otto the Victorious 
 Otto, Duke of Brunswick-Grubenhagen (1320–1398), also called Otto the Tarantine
 Otto I, Duke of Brunswick-Harburg (1495–1549)
 Otto II, Duke of Brunswick-Harburg (1528–1603)
 Otto III, Duke of Brunswick-Harburg (1572–1641)
 Otto II, Duke of Brunswick-Osterode (1396-1452) 
 Duke Otto Henry of Brunswick-Harburg (1555-1591)
 Francis Otto, Duke of Brunswick-Lüneburg (1530–1559)
 Otto II of Brunswick-Wolfenbüttel (c. 1364–1406), Archbishop of Bremen